Platyptilia sabius is a moth of the family Pterophoridae. It is known from the Democratic Republic of Congo, Ethiopia, South Africa and Tanzania.

References

sabius
Insects of the Democratic Republic of the Congo
Moths of Africa
Insects of Ethiopia
Insects of Tanzania
Moths described in 1875